Moshe Lion, or Moshe Leon (born 6 October 1961), is an Israeli politician who is currently the Mayor of Jerusalem. He previously served as a member of the Jerusalem City Council, director-general of the Prime Minister's Office, Chairman of the Israel Railways, and head of the Jerusalem Development Authority.

Lion is the first mayor of Jerusalem of Sephardi descent.

Early life 
Moshe Lion was born in the Florentin neighborhood of Tel Aviv, Israel, and attended . His father's family comes from Thessaloniki, while his mother has roots in Aden. As a child, he moved with his family to Givatayim. Lion served in the Israel Defence Forces, where he was assigned to the military chaplaincy and sang with the IDF rabbinical choir. He occasionally still leads synagogue services. Lion graduated with a BA in economics and accounting from Bar-Ilan University, and interned in the office of Avigdor Yitzhaki, receiving his CPA in 1990. His brother, Dr. Nissim Lion, is a lecturer in the Department of Sociology and Anthropology at Bar-Ilan University.

Professional career 
In 1991, Lion founded Yitzhaki & Co., together with Avigdor Yitzhaki and two other partners. Among his clients was the Likud movement, which he advised following their economic losses after losing the 1992 Knesset elections. He retired in 2017.

In July 2014, he was appointed chairman of the board of directors of the Mayanei Hayeshua Medical Center in Bnei Brak.

Public career 
In 1996, Lion was appointed managing director of the Prime Minister's Office of Benjamin Netanyahu, also becoming his economic adviser, serving in those roles till 1999.

From 2003-2006, he was appointed chairman of the Israel Railways after having previously worked with the Ports and Railways Authority. Lion finished his term in 2006, after his term was not extended.

In 2008, he was appointed chairman of the Jerusalem Development Authority. Under his tenure, the First Station train complex in Jerusalem was completed.

Political career
Lion was chosen to help negotiate the forming of a government coalition following the Israeli elections of 2013, in the aftermath of which the Likud and Yisrael Beitenu parties joined together.

In 2013, Lion ran for Mayor of Jerusalem, receiving 45% of the vote, but lost to incumbent mayor Nir Barkat. The Likud party under his leadership received one mandate, and he became a member of the Jerusalem City Council on its behalf.

In August 2015, Lion joined the municipal coalition and the faction of Mayor Nir Barkat. As part of the coalition agreement signed between the two, he began to serve as a member of the city administration, and as the holder of the community management portfolio.

On 25 March 2018, Lion announced his intention to run for Mayor of Jerusalem in the election scheduled for 30 October 2018. During the campaign, Lion stated that he opposed the Netanyahu government's plan, put forward by Jerusalem Affairs Minister and campaign challenger Ze'ev Elkin, to erect a barrier dividing East Jerusalem from the rest of the city.

Despite his broad Haredi political support, a coalition of Hasidic and extremist-Haredi Jerusalem Faction leaders declined to endorse Lion, citing his close ties to government official Avigdor Lieberman. Lieberman advanced legislation to draft Haredim into the army, making Lion more likely to "secularize" Jerusalem, according to the Hasidic coalition.

In the six-candidate general election held on 30 October 2018, Lion garnered 33% of the vote, while fellow Jerusalem city councilman Ofer Berkovitch finished in second place, with 29%. This earned them spots in a run-off election scheduled two weeks later, because according to election laws, candidates in municipal races must gain at least 40% of the vote in order to win. On 13 November, Lion won the run-off election with 50.85% of the vote, to Berkovitch's 49.15%, thereby becoming the first mayor of Jerusalem of Sephardi descent.

Personal life 
Lion is married, with four children, and lives in Jerusalem's Rehavia neighborhood.

References 

1961 births
Israeli accountants
Israeli hazzans
Israeli military chaplains
Israeli Orthodox Jews
Jewish Israeli politicians
Mayors of Jerusalem
Jewish mayors
People from Givatayim
Railway executives
Israeli Sephardi Jews
Living people
Israeli people of Greek-Jewish descent
Israeli people of Yemeni-Jewish descent
Sephardi politicians
City councillors of Jerusalem